Chuck "The Coach" Dickerson is a retired position coach in the National Football League and Canadian Football League and former sports radio host in Buffalo, New York.

Dickerson earned All-American honors during his high school and college career as a defensive tackle for the University of Illinois. He is married and has an adult child and several grandchildren.
 
Dickerson was defensive line coach under Marv Levy in Buffalo and in the Canadian Football League when Levy coached the Montreal Alouettes. He appeared in two Super Bowls: Super Bowl XXV and Super Bowl XXVI.

Super Bowl XXVI controversy
Before Super Bowl XXVI, Dickerson mocked the Washington Redskins' famed offensive line, "The Hogs", in a television interview. Dickerson said Redskins tackle Joe Jacoby was "a Neanderthal -- he slobbers a lot, he probably kicks dogs in his neighborhood." He also said tackle Jim Lachey "has bad breath. Players will fall down without him even touching them."

Redskins coach Joe Gibbs got his hands on some tapes of Dickerson and played them at a team meeting on the night before the game, and by all accounts it was a factor in the Redskins' 37–24 thumping of the Bills.  Head coach Marv Levy later described the interview as "the girder that brought down the building." Levy fired Dickerson three days after the game.

Radio and television career
Dickerson began his broadcast career on WGR 550 in 1993, hosting a three-hour afternoon drive-time show for almost ten years, leaving the station in 2003. In his last year on air, he was forced to share a program with Mike Schopp, who had previously been Dickerson's nemesis at crosstown rival WNSA. It was speculated in the press that WGR released Dickerson from the station because it wanted to gain the rights to Sabres hockey broadcasts, which it purchased in 2004 along with radio station WNSA. Dickerson was replaced as Schopp's co-host by Chris "Bulldog" Parker.

Dickerson also appeared on CanWest Global television's Sportsline show in Toronto for several season's as an NFL commentator.

His on-air style is similar to hockey's Don Cherry, Dickerson is known for his blunt and provocative opinions.  His closing catchphrase, "Who loves ya, baby?" is borrowed from Kojak .

As recently as the late 2000s, Dickerson hosted The Unofficial, Unauthorized Postgame Show after Bills games and cohosted The Bob Matthews Show Monday evenings on WHAM-AM 1180 in Rochester, New York. He also co-hosted The Extra Point Monday mornings on WGR-AM 550 in Buffalo, New York, replacing the fired Brad Riter in 2007 after being a weekly guest since 2005. (John Murphy later took over that time slot.)

A similar character, "Chuck Dichter," appears in the 2002 made-for-TV movie Second String, portrayed by Jon Voight. The Super Bowl incident was also parodied (with Lucy van Pelt in the role of the Dickerson-like antagonist) in You're in the Super Bowl, Charlie Brown, in which a team of buffalo (Bisons) is subsequently clobbered by Snoopy's team after the rant.

Notes

External links
Fybush, Scott. Radio Watch Report about Sabres coach refusing to join WGR because of Dickerson bias. North East RadioWatch: February 4, 2000
Dickerson's profile, via the Internet Archive

Year of birth missing (living people)
Living people
American football defensive tackles
Buffalo Bills coaches
Illinois Fighting Illini football players
Montreal Alouettes coaches
Sports commentators